Venu Rajamony (born 12 November 1960) is an Indian diplomat and historian who belongs to the Indian Foreign Service. On 17 September 2021, he assumed the post of Officer on Special Duty, External Cooperation (with the rank of Chief Secretary) in the Government of Kerala. He is a concurrent faculty of Diplomatic Practice at the Jindal Global Law School of the O.P. Jindal Global University, Sonipat, Haryana. He was the Ambassador of India to the Netherlands from 2017 to 2020. He was also the Permanent Representative of India to the Organization for the Prohibition of Chemical Weapons (OPCW) in The Hague as well as responsible for India’s relations with the International Court of Justice (ICJ) and the Permanent Court of Arbitration (PCA).

In addition, he held the post of Press Secretary to the President of India during the tenure of President Pranab Mukherjee from 2012 to 2017.

Born in Thiruvananthapuram, Kerala, he completed his primary education there before moving with his parents to Kochi. He holds degrees in Politics from Kerala University and Law from Mahatma Gandhi University, Kerala, and a postgraduate degree in International Studies from Jawaharlal Nehru University, New Delhi.

He began his career as a journalist with the Indian Express, Kochi, in 1983 and qualified for the Indian Foreign Service in 1986. Fluent in the Chinese language, Rajamony is also proficient in Malayalam, Tamil, Hindi and French. He has served as a diplomat in Indian missions in Hong Kong, Beijing, Geneva, Dubai, and Washington, D.C.

Early life and education 
Venu Rajamony was born on 12 November 1960 in Thiruvananthapuram, capital of the South Indian state of Kerala, to K S Rajamony, a lawyer, and Seetha Rajamony.

K S Rajamony practiced law in Thiruvananthapuram and Kochi for more than 40 years and was involved in the formation of the first Bar Council of Kerala; the Lok Adalat, which provided free legal services to the poor; the Kerala People's Arts Club (KPAC), and the Thiruvananthapuram Flying Club. Seetha Rajamony, who had studied  in Holy Angels Convent, Women's College, and University College was active in the Trivandrum Women’s Club and Inner Wheel Club.

Growing up in Kunnumpuram behind the Ayurveda College in Thiruvananthapuram, Venu Rajamony completed his primary education in Holy Angels Convent. The next three years were in St. Joseph's School near the General Hospital. Rajamony's high school days in St. Joseph's of the Woods, Kalamassery (1973–1976) began with his family's shift to Kochi. He subsequently did a pre-degree course in Maharajas College, Ernakulam (1976–1978) and graduated from there in 1981 with a BA in Politics. He was elected as Chairman of the Maharaja's College Students' Union during 1980–81 under the panel of Kerala Students Union.

Moving to New Delhi to do a Master's degree in International Studies from Jawaharlal Nehru University (JNU), he was Vice President of the Students' Union there during 1981 and 1982. Later, he secured an LLB degree from Ernakulam Law College, Mahatma Gandhi University (1983–1986).

Rajamony was a staff correspondent of the Indian Express, Kochi, from 1983 to 1986. He qualified for the Indian Foreign Service in 1986 after appearing for the examination at University College, Thiruvananthapuram. Rajamony also holds a Certificate in Chinese Language from the University of Hong Kong.

Venu Rajamony is married to Saroj Thapa, an educationist from Darjeeling, and they have two sons.

Political career
While serving as Consul General of India in Dubai from 2007 to 2010, Rajamony took several initiatives for the welfare of the two million-strong Indian community there and also to promote trade and investment between the UAE and India.

During his tenure in the Netherlands, Rajamony appeared on behalf of India before the ICJ in The Hague in the matter of "Advisory Opinion concerning the Legal Consequences of the Separation of the Chagos Archipelago from Mauritius." He was a member of the Indian delegation before the ICJ in the Jadhav case (India Vs. Pakistan) and Co-Agent of India in the case concerning the Enrica Lexie incident (Italy Vs. India) before the PCA. He was also the leader of the Indian delegation to multiple sessions of the Conference of States Parties and Executive Council of the OPCW.

As OSD, Ambassador Rajamony’s mandate includes interaction with the Indian Ministry of External Affairs, foreign missions based in India and Indian diplomatic missions abroad on various matters, including those pertaining to the Kerala diaspora. His responsibilities include exploring external cooperation opportunities for the state in diverse sectors, including business, trade, investments, finance, skill development, education, culture etc. He also supports the state government in its interaction with foreign officials and business delegations visiting the state as well as in the follow up to official visits by the Chief Minister of Kerala abroad. He is based in New Delhi and functions out of the Kerala House.

Literary career
Venu Rajamony's book "What Can We Learn From The Dutch - Rebuilding Kerala Post 2018 Floods'' was released in Kerala in January 2019. The book describes the Dutch response to floods over history, their innovations in water management, and the lessons Kerala can learn from the Dutch. The book highlights the need for the state to equip itself with technical know-how and expertise to avoid another such disaster.

Another notable work is a coffee table book titled "India and the UAE: In Celebration of a Legendary Friendship."  A Malayalam version of the book was released in Kerala in 2013 and an Arabic version was published in the UAE in 2014.

His book "India and the Netherlands - Past, Present and Future" has won praise as an encyclopedia of the cross-cultural legacy between India and the Netherlands. It presents vivid snapshots of relations between the two nations over the centuries and brings to life the compelling personalities whose contributions shaped the Indo-Dutch discourse.

He also authored a monograph titled "The India-China-US Triangle: A Soft Balance of Power in the Making" during his fellowship at the Centre for Strategic and International Studies (CSIS) in Washington, DC during 2001-2002.

India and the UAE: In Celebration of a Legendary Friendship, Lustre Publications, 2008, 
India and The Netherlands – Past, Present and Future, Bombay Ink, 2019, 
What We Can Learn From The Dutch – Rebuilding Kerala Post 2018 Floods, DC Books, 2019, 
Select Paintings of Rashtrapati Bhavan (Portfolio), Lalit Kala Akademi, 2016, 
Company Paintings in Rashtrapati Bhavan (Portfolio), Lalit Kala Akademi, 2016, 
Paintings in the Ashoka Hall of Rashtrapati Bhavan (Portfolio), Lalit Kala Akademi, 2016,

References

External links

1960 births
Living people
Indian Foreign Service officers
Ambassadors of India to the Netherlands